Natalie Shiyanova (born July 12, 1979, Russia) is a Russian actress.

Biography
Natalie Shiyanova trained at the Moscow Art Theatre (MXAT) from 1998 to 1998, and has appeared in Russian film and television from 1998 to the present.  She moved to the United States to play the lead female part in the 2009 film Victory Day.  Shiyanova's character, "Oksana Tihomirova", is a woman from a small town in Russia who is unwittingly trafficked into prostitution in the west. The film is in English and Russian. It is Shiyanova's first role in English.

References 

 Moscow Times, December 20, 2008,  Shooter Takes on Oligarch in American Thriller

External links

1979 births
Living people
Russian film actresses
Russian television actresses